The 2015–16 Valparaiso Crusaders men's basketball team represented Valparaiso University during the 2015–16 NCAA Division I men's basketball season. The Crusaders, led by fifth year head coach Bryce Drew, played their home games at the Athletics–Recreation Center and were members of the Horizon League. They finished the season 30–7, 16–2 in Horizon League play to win the regular season championship. They lost in the semifinals of the Horizon League tournament to Green Bay. As a regular season conference champion who failed to win their conference tournament, received an automatic bid to the National Invitation Tournament. As one of the last four teams left out of the NCAA tournament, they received a #1 seed in the NIT where they defeated Texas Southern, Florida State, Saint Mary's, and BYU to advance to the championship game  where they lost to George Washington.

This season was Bryce Drew's final season as Valparaiso head coach. He accepted the Vanderbilt head coaching job on April 5, 2016. He finished at Valpo with a five-year record of 124–49 and went to the postseason every year as head coach.

Previous season 

The Crusaders finished the 2014–15 season with an overall record of 28–6, and 13–3 to win the Horizon League regular season championship. They defeated Cleveland State and Green Bay to win the Horizon League tournament championship. They received an automatic bid to the NCAA tournament where they lost in the second round to Maryland.

Pre-season
On July 31, 2015, the NCAA announced that senior Vashil Fernandez, the 2015 Horizon League Defensive Player of the Year, would be granted an additional year of eligibility. The Crusaders therefore returned 98.9 percent of their minutes from the previous season in which they won both the Horizon League regular season and tournament championships. All five starting players from 2014-15 returned to the 2015-16 team.

Departures

Class of 2015 signees
On October 7, 2014 Derrik Smits, son of former NBA Center Rik Smits, committed to Valparaiso.

Class of 2016 signees

Season results 
The Crusaders won 16 games in Horizon League play and lost 2, both to Wright State. The Crusaders won the Horizon League regular season championship, three games ahead of second place Oakland.

After Valparaiso won the regular season Horizon League championship, a Fox Sports writer noted that the Crusaders' strengths were defense, rebounding, depth and experience, and that Valpo—"perhaps the best mid-major team in college basketball this year"—was still likely to be on the edge of the March Madness selection process. ESPN's Eamonn Brennan wrote that Valpo was "a really good team that was banged up in nonconference play and -- in the Watch's humble opinion -- probably deserves to be in the tournament at the end of the day."

In January 2016, ESPN selected coach Bryce Drew as one of its ten national Coach of the Year finalists. As of late February 2016, the Crusaders allowed opponents 0.87 points per possession, best of all Division I teams. Senior center Vashil Fernandez was again the league's Defensive Player of the Year, and junior forward Alec Peters was named again to the All League First Team. For the third time in five seasons, Bryce Drew was named the league's Coach of the Year. Vashil Fernandez earned the 2016 Lefty Driesell Award as the nation's top defensive player.

However, Valpo lost their first game of the Horizon League Tournament, losing to Green Bay in the semifinals. The Crusaders failed to receive an at-large bid to the NCAA tournament.

As the winners of the Horizon League regular season, the Crusaders received an automatic bid to the National Invitation Tournament. Valpo received a #1 seed and defeated Texas Southern, Florida State, and Saint Mary's to advance to the NIT Final Four at Madison Square Garden. There, they defeated BYU to advance to the NIT Championship game versus George Washington. After a close first half, George Washington ran away with the game in the second half, defeating Valpo 76–60.

Following the season, head coach Bryce Drew accepted the head coaching position at Vanderbilt.

Roster

Schedule
The 2015–2016 Valparaiso University men's basketball schedule is:

|-
!colspan=9 style="background:#613318; color:#FFCC00;"| Exhibition

|-
!colspan=9 style="background:#613318; color:#FFCC00;"| Regular season

|-
!colspan=9 style="background:#613318; color:#FFCC00;"| Horizon League regular season

|-
!colspan=9 style="background:#613318; color:#FFCC00;"|Horizon League tournament

|-
!colspan=9 style="background:#613318; color:#FFCC00;"|NIT

|-

References

Valparaiso
Valparaiso Beacons men's basketball seasons
Valparaiso Crusaders men's basket
Valparaiso Crusaders men's basket
Valparaiso